Pempidine is a ganglion-blocking drug, first reported in 1958 by two research groups working independently, and introduced as an oral treatment for hypertension.

Pharmacology
Reports on the "classical" pharmacology of pempidine have been published. The Spinks group, at ICI, compared pempidine, its N-ethyl analogue, and mecamylamine in considerable detail, with additional data related to several structurally simpler compounds.

Toxicology
LD50 for the HCl salt of pempidine in mice: 74 mg/kg (i.v.); 125 mg/kg (i.p.); 413 mg/kg (p.o.).

Chemistry
Pempidine is an aliphatic, sterically hindered, cyclic, tertiary amine, which is a weak base: in its protonated form it has a pKa of 11.25.

Pempidine is a liquid with a boiling point of 187–188 °C and a density of 0.858 g/cm3.

Two early syntheses of this compound are those of Leonard and Hauck, and Hall. These are very similar in principle: Leonard and Hauck reacted phorone with ammonia, to produce 2,2,6,6-tetramethyl-4-piperidone, which was then reduced by means of the Wolff–Kishner reduction to 2,2,6,6-tetramethylpiperidine; this secondary amine was then N-methylated using methyl iodide and potassium carbonate.

Hall's method involved reacting acetone with ammonia in the presence of calcium chloride to give 2,2,6,6-tetramethyl-4-piperidone, which was then reduced under Wolff-Kishner conditions, followed by N-methylation of the resulting 2,2,6,6-tetramethylpiperidine with methyl p-toluenesulfonate.

References

External links 
 

Nicotinic antagonists
Piperidines
Reagents for organic chemistry